Thyrsodium is a genus of plants in the family Anacardiaceae.

Taxonomy

Species
, Plants of the World online has 6 accepted species:

 Thyrsodium bolivianum 
 Thyrsodium guianense 
 Thyrsodium herrerense 
 Thyrsodium puberulum 
 Thyrsodium rondonianum 
 Thyrsodium spruceanum

References

 
Anacardiaceae genera
Taxonomy articles created by Polbot